Stations of the Tide is a science fiction novel by American author Michael Swanwick. Prior to being published in book form in 1991, it was serialized in Isaac Asimov's Science Fiction Magazine in two parts, starting in mid-December 1990.

It won the Nebula Award for Best Novel in 1991, was nominated for both the Hugo and Campbell Awards in 1992, and was nominated for the Arthur C. Clarke Award in 1993.

Plot introduction 

Stations of the Tide is the story of an unnamed bureaucrat with the Department of Technology Transfer. The story opens with the bureaucrat descending to the surface of the planet Miranda to hunt a magician who has smuggled proscribed technology past the orbital embargo, seeking to bring him to justice before the world is transformed by the flood of the Jubilee Tides. It is generally considered to be the "One Hundred Years Of Solitude" of Science Fiction Novels, beloved by writers, but, not as much by the rank-and-file readership.

References

External links 
 
 Stations of the Tide at Worlds Without End

1990 American novels
1990 science fiction novels
American science fiction novels
Nebula Award for Best Novel-winning works
Novels by Michael Swanwick
Novels first published in serial form
Works originally published in Asimov's Science Fiction